Aiglemont is a commune in the Ardennes department in France.

Population

See also
Communes of the Ardennes department

References

External links
Official site

Communes of Ardennes (department)